Koliyakode  is a village in Thiruvananthapuram district in the state of Kerala, India.

Demographics
 India census, Koliyakode had a population of 18973 with 9188 males and 9785 females.

References

Villages in Thiruvananthapuram district